Neobassia is a genus of small shrubs in the family Chenopodiaceae (sensu stricto), which are included in Amaranthaceae family, (sensu lato) according to the APG classification. Species are endemic to Australia.

Description
Species have alternate, sessile leaves. Flowers are bisexual, solitary in the leaf axil. The perianth is 5-lobed with 5 stamens. The fruiting perianth is cylindrical, crustaceous to woody, with 5 spines arising from the base of the lobes, which distinguishes it from Sclerolaena. Pericarp membranous, seed vertical, testa membranous, embryo U-shaped, with an erect radicle, perisperm central.

Species
Species include, according to Kew;
Neobassia astrocarpa  (F. Muell.) A.J. Scott
Neobassia proceriflora (F. Muell.) A.J. Scott

Taxonomy
The genus name of Neobassia is in honour of Ferdinando Bassi (1710–1774), Italian botanist. 
It was first described and published in Feddes Repert. Vol.89 on page 117 in 1978.

References

External links

Amaranthaceae
Amaranthaceae genera
Caryophyllales of Australia
Plants described in 1978
Flora of Australia